Gummels Heliport Paramaribo , is the first dedicated Heliport built in Suriname in 2015 at the Gummelsweg in the neighborhood of Kwatta near the city of Paramaribo, Suriname. Privately owned and used by the Gummels family who also own the Gum Air airline and the crop dust service Surinam Sky Farmers. The heliport is mainly used for helicopter charters and primarily for offshore development activities. Gum Air is currently constructing a new 3600-foot runway at this Gummels Heliport Paramaribo. The airline plans to utilize a new Cessna 408 SkyCourier it has on order for flights between Paramaribo, Georgetown, Port of Spain, and Cayenne. The new airport will mainly support the Oil & Gas, and Cargo sectors with charter flights from 2023 on.

Charters 
Major charter airlines and others serving this airport are:
Era Helicopters
Gum Air
Hi-Jet Helicopter Services
Overeem Air Service
Pegasus Air Services
United Air Services

See also

 List of airports in Suriname
 Transport in Suriname

References

Airports in Suriname